Trevor Gorman is the head coach of the Albany Great Danes men's soccer team; a position he has held since 2011.  Prior to his position at Albany, he served as an assistant coach for the Wright State Raiders and Dartmouth Big Green.  In 2016, the Great Danes won the America East Conference men's soccer championship for the first time, and qualified for the NCAA tournament. His father, Barry Gorman, is Penn State's all-time winningest soccer coach.

Head coaching record

References

External links
Biography at ualbanysports.com

1982 births
Living people
Albany Great Danes men's soccer coaches
American people of Northern Ireland descent
American soccer coaches
Association football midfielders
Penn State Nittany Lions men's soccer players
Pennsylvania State University alumni
Association football players not categorized by nationality